The British Journal of Pharmacology is a biweekly peer-reviewed medical journal covering all aspects of experimental pharmacology. It is published for the British Pharmacological Society by Wiley-Blackwell. It was established in 1946 as the British Journal of Pharmacology and Chemotherapy. The journal obtained its current title in 1968.

The current editor-in-chief is Amrita Ahluwalia. Previous editors-in-chief include  Ian McGrath, Humphrey Rang, Alan North, Phil Moore, Bill Large, and Tony Birmingham. A sister journal, also published for the British Pharmacological Society by Wiley-Blackwell is the British Journal of Clinical Pharmacology. The journal publishes research papers, review articles, commentaries and correspondence in all fields of pharmacology. It also publishes themed issues, as well as supplements.

The Concise Guide to PHARMACOLOGY
The Concise Guide to PHARMACOLOGY is a supplement of the British Journal of Pharmacology, replacing the "Guide to Receptors and Channels". It is produced in association with the Nomenclature Committee of the International Union of Basic and Clinical Pharmacology. The current version, The Concise Guide to PHARMACOLOGY 2019/2020, was published in December 2019, and edited by Stephen Alexander, Eamonn Kelly, Alistair Mathie, John Peters and Emma Veale. This edition is a compilation of the major pharmacological targets divided into seven sections: G protein-coupled receptors, ion channels, catalytic receptors, nuclear receptors, transporters, and enzymes. These are presented with nomenclature guidance and summary information on the best available pharmacological tools, alongside suggestions for further reading. It is freely available online and also available in hard copy. Previous editions of the "Guide to Receptors and Channels" are available through PubMed Central. The content of the "Concise Guide to PHARMACOLOGY" is also available through the online portal Guide to PHARMACOLOGY.

Abstracting and indexing
The journal is abstracted and indexed in:

According to the Journal Citation Reports, the journal has a 2019 impact factor of 7.73, ranking it 9th out of 270 journals in the category "Pharmacology & Pharmacy". In the year 2017 and 2019, the journal had the highest impact factor of journals in the category "Pharmacology and Pharmacy" when excluding journals that publish solely review articles.

References

External links

Guide to Receptors and Channels, 5th edition
Guide to Pharmacology

Health in the London Borough of Islington
Publications established in 1946
Wiley-Blackwell academic journals
Biweekly journals
English-language journals
Pharmacology journals
Academic journals associated with learned and professional societies of the United Kingdom